This is a list of justice ministers of France, working for the French Ministry of Justice.

1790 to the Third Republic 

 Marguerite-Louis-François Duport-Dutertre, 1790–1792
 Jean Marie Roland de la Platière, March–April, 1792
 Antoine Duranton, April–July, 1792
 Étienne Dejoly, July–August, 1792
 Georges Jacques Danton, August–October, 1792
 Dominique Joseph Garat, 1792–1793
 Louis Gohier, 1793–1794
 Philippe-Antoine Merlin de Douai, 1795–1796
 Jean Joseph Victor Génissieu, January–April, 1796
 Philippe Antoine Merlin de Douai, 1796–1797
 Charles Joseph Lambrechts, 1797–1799
 Jean Jacques Régis de Cambacérès, July–December, 1799
 André Joseph Abrial, 1799–1802
 Claude Ambroise Régnier, duc de Massa, 1802–1813
 Mathieu Louis Molé, 1813–1814
 Pierre Paul Nicolas Henrion de Pansey, April–May, 1814
 Charles-Henri Dambray, 1814–1815
 Jean Jacques Régis de Cambacérès, March–June, 1815
 Antoine Boulay de la Meurthe, June–July, 1815
 Étienne-Denis Pasquier, July–September, 1815
 François de Barbé-Marbois, 1815–1816
 Charles-Henri Dambray, 1816–1817
 Étienne-Denis Pasquier, 1817–1818
 Pierre François Hercule de Serre, 1818–1821
 Pierre-Denis, Comte de Peyronnet, 1821–1828
 Joseph Marie Portalis, 1828–1829
 Pierre Bourdeau, May–August 1829
 Jean de Courvoisier, 1829–1830
 Jean de Chantelauze, May–July, 1830
 Jacques Charles Dupont de l'Eure, July–December, 1830
 Joseph Mérilhou, 1830–1831
 Félix Barthe, 1831–1834
 Jean-Charles Persil, 1834–1836
 Paul Jean Pierre Sauzet, February–September, 1836
 Jean-Charles Persil, 1836–1837
 Félix Barthe, 1837–1839
 Amédée Girod de l'Ain, March–May, 1839
 Jean-Baptiste Teste, 1839–1840
 Alexandre-François Vivien, March–October, 1840
 Nicolas Martin du Nord, 1840–1847
 Michel Hébert, 1847–1848
 Adolphe Crémieux, February–June, 1848
 Eugène Bethmont, June–July, 1848
 Alexandre Marie, July–December, 1848
 Eugène Rouher, 1847–1851
 Eugène Corbin, October–November, 1851
 Alfred Daviel, November–December, 1851
 Eugène Rouher, 1851–1852
 Jacques Pierre Abbatucci, 1852–1857
 Paul de Royer, 1857–1859
 Claude Delangle, 1859–1863
 Pierre Jules Baroche, 1863–1869
 Jean-Baptiste Duvergier, 1869–1870
 Émile Ollivier, January–August 1870
 Théodore Grandperret, August–September, 1870

Paris Commune 
 Eugène Protot, 16 April-28 May 1871

Third Republic 
 Adolphe Crémieux, 1870–1871
 Jules Dufaure, 1871–1873
 Jean Ernoul, May–November, 1873
 Octave Depeyre, 1873–1874
 Adrien Tailhand, 1874–1875
 Jules Dufaure, 1875–1876
 Louis Martel, 1876–1877
 Albert, duc de Broglie, May–November, 1877
 François Le Pelletier, November–December, 1877
 Jules Dufaure, 1877–1879
 Philippe Le Royer, February–December, 1879
 Jules Cazot, 1879–1882
 Gustave Humbert, January–August, 1882
 Paul Devès, 1882–1883
 Félix Martin-Feuillée, 1883–1885
 Henri Brisson, 1885–1886
 Charles Demôle, January–December, 1886
 Ferdinand Sarrien, 1886–1887
 Charles Mazeau, May–November, 1887
 Armand Fallières, 1887–1888
 Jean-Baptiste Ferrouillat, 1888–1889
 Jean François Edmond Guyot Dessaigne, February, 1889
 François Thévenet, 1889–1890
 Armand Fallières, 1890–1892
 Louis Ricard, February–December, 1892
 Léon Bourgeois, 1892–1893
 Jules Develle, March, 1893
 Léon Bourgeois, March–April, 1893
 Eugène Guérin, April–December, 1893
 Antonin Dubost, 1893–1894
 Eugène Guérin, 1894–1895
 Ludovic Trarieux, January–November, 1895
 Louis Ricard, 1895–1896
 Jean-Baptiste Darlan, 1896–1897
 Victor Milliard, 1897–1898
 Ferdinand Sarrien, June–November, 1898
 Georges Lebret, 1898–1899
 Ernest Monis, 1899–1902
 Ernest Vallé, 1902–1905
 Joseph Chaumié, 1905–1906
 Ferdinand Sarrien, March–October, 1906
 Jean François Edmond Guyot Dessaigne, 1906–1907
 Aristide Briand, 1908–1909
 Louis Barthou, 1909–1910
 Théodore Girard, 1910–1911
 Antoine Perrier, March–June, 1911
 Jean Cruppi, 1911–1912
 Aristide Briand, 1912–1913
 Louis Barthou, January–March, 1913
 Antony Ratier, March–December, 1913
 Jean-Baptiste Bienvenu-Martin, 1913–1914
 Alexandre Ribot, June, 1914
 Jean Bienvenu-Martin, June–August, 1914
 Aristide Briand, 1914–1915
 René Viviani, 1915–1917
 Raoul Péret, September–November, 1917
 Louis Nail, 1917–1920
 Gustave L'Hopiteau, 1920–1921
 Laurent Bonnevay, 1921–1922
 Louis Barthou, January–October, 1922
 Maurice Colrat, 1922–1924
 Edmond Lefebvre du Prey, March–June, 1924
 Antony Ratier, June, 1924
 René Renoult, 1924–1925
 Théodore Steeg, April–October, 1925
 Anatole de Monzie, October, 1925
 Camille Chautemps, October–November, 1925
 René Renoult, 1925–1926
 Pierre Laval, March–July 1926
 Maurice Colrat, July, 1926
 Louis Barthou, 1926–1929
 Lucien Hubert, 1929–1930
 Théodore Steeg, February–March, 1930
 Raoul Péret, March–November 1930
 Henry Chéron, 1931
 Léon Bérard, 1931–1932
 Paul Reynaud, February–June, 1932
 René Renoult, June–December 1932
 Abel Gardey, 1932–1933
 Eugène Penancier, January–October, 1933
 Albert Dalimier, October–November 1933
 Eugène Raynaldy, 1933–1934
 Eugène Penancier, January–February, 1934
 Henry Chéron, February–October, 1934
 Henry Lémery, October–November, 1934
 Georges Pernot, 1934–1935
 Léon Bérard, 1935–1936
 Marc Rucart, 1936–1937
 Vincent Auriol, 1937–1938
 César Campinchi, January–March 1938
 Marc Rucart, March–April, 1938
 Paul Reynaud, April–November 1938
 Paul Marchandeau, 1938–1939
 Georges Bonnet, 1939–1940
 Albert Sérol, March–June 1940
 Charles Frémicourt, June–July 1940

Vichy France 
 Raphaël Alibert, 1940–1941
 Joseph Barthélémy, 1941–1943
 Maurice Gabolde, 1943–1944

Free France 
 René Cassin, September 1941 – June 1943
 Jules Abadie, June–September, 1943
 François de Menthon, 1943–1944

Fourth Republic 
 François de Menthon, 1944–1945
 Pierre-Henri Teitgen, 1945–1946
 Paul Ramadier, 1946–1947
 André Marie, 1947–1948
 Robert Lecourt, July–September 1948
 André Marie, 1948–1949
 Robert Lecourt, February–October 1949
 René Mayer, 1949–1951
 Edgar Faure, 1952–1952
 Léon Martinaud-Déplat 1952–1953
 Paul Ribeyre, 1953–1954
 Émile Hugues, June–September 1954
 Jean Michel Guérin du Bosq de Beaumont, 1954–1955
 Emmanuel Temple, January–February 1955
 Robert Schuman, 1955–1956
 François Mitterrand, 1956–1957
 Édouard Corniglion-Molinier, February–June 1957
 Robert Lecourt, 1957–1958

Fifth Republic 
 Michel Debré, 1958–1959
 Edmond Michelet, 1959–1962
 Bernard Chenot, 1961–1962
 Jean Foyer, 1962–1967
 Louis Joxe, 1968
 René Capitant, 1968–1969
 Jean-Marcel Jeanneney, April–June, 1969
 René Pleven, 1969–1973
 Jean Taittinger, 1973–1974
 Jean Lecanuet, 1974–1976
 Olivier Guichard, 1976–1977
 Alain Peyrefitte, 1977–1981
 Maurice Faure, May–June, 1981
 Robert Badinter, 1981–1986
 Michel Crépeau, February–March, 1986
 Albin Chalandon, 1986–1988
 Pierre Arpaillange, 1988–1990
 Henri Nallet, 1990–1992
 Michel Vauzelle, 1992–1993
 Pierre Méhaignerie, 1993–1995
 Jacques Toubon, 1994–1997
 Élisabeth Guigou, 1997–2000
 Marylise Lebranchu, 2000–2002
 Dominique Perben, 2002–2005
 Pascal Clément, 2005–2007
 Rachida Dati, 2007–2009
 Michèle Alliot-Marie, 2009–2010
 Michel Mercier, 2010–2012
 Christiane Taubira, 2012–2016
 Jean-Jacques Urvoas, 2016–2017
 François Bayrou, May–June, 2017
 Nicole Belloubet, 2017–2020
 Éric Dupond-Moretti, 2020-

See also
 Grand Chancellor of France

References

Government of France